Little Saint James is a small private island in the United States Virgin Islands, located southeast of neighboring Great Saint James, both off the southern coast of the larger St. Thomas island and belonging to the subdistrict East End, St. Thomas. The 70- to 78-acre (28 to 32 ha) island was owned by American convicted child sex offender Jeffrey Epstein from 1998 until his 2019 death. During Epstein's ownership, the island acquired local nicknames such as "Island of Sin" and "Pedophile Island."

Ownership

In 1997, Little St. James was owned by venture capitalist Arch Cummin and was for sale for $10.5 million. In April 1998, a company called L.S.J. LLC purchased the island for $7.95 million, and documents showed that Jeffrey Epstein was the sole member of L.S.J. In 2019, the island was valued at $63,874,223. The island was Epstein's primary residence, and he called the island "Little St. Jeff". The main house on the island was renovated by Edward Tuttle, a designer of the Aman Resorts. In 2008, Epstein's estate on Little Saint James had 70 staff. According to a former staffer, Epstein insisted on discretion and confidentiality from his employees.

In March 2022, Little Saint James and the neighboring Great Saint James were listed at $125 million. A lawyer for Epstein's estate stated that the money obtained from the sale would be used to settle a number of lawsuits. Bespoke Real Estate, the agency jointly overseeing the sale, stated that further information on the listing was only available to prospective buyers.

Buildings 
In 1997, the island had a main house, three guest cottages, a caretaker's cottage, a private desalination system, a helipad, and a dock. In addition, there is a blue-striped, boxlike building that initially was topped by a golden dome. The purpose of this construction is unclear, as it deviates in substantial ways from the plans for the music pavilion that had been submitted for approval in 2010 by Epstein's architects. The original building in the plans was of an octagonal footprint, rectangular in cross-section, and had two side rooms extending from the outside walls. It was also much lower in perspective, and the dome extended from the octagon over onto the roofs of the side buildings. The building that was eventually constructed was much taller, in the shape of a cube, and without any side rooms. The dome was also well within the footprint of the cube, and the building did not have any of the proposed finishes applied to the walls, nor was it constructed out of materials in those plans—namely, stone.

Visitors
Victoria's Secret models were among the guests a former employee saw there, and Les Wexner visited the island at least once. Prince Andrew, Duke of York paid at least one visit aboard Epstein's private jet to the island, although former staff claimed he visited Little St. James several times.

Bill Clinton is widely reported to have visited Little St. James. Clinton flew on Epstein's private jet to Little St. James on multiple occasions between 2002 and 2005. Virginia Roberts, later known as Virginia Giuffre, claims in a lawsuit that while working at Donald Trump's Mar-a-Lago resort she was lured into a sex-trafficking ring run by Epstein and while traveling with Epstein she saw Clinton on the island. In a 2011 conversation with her lawyers, Roberts claimed Clinton traveled to Epstein's retreat on Little St. James in 2002. A Freedom of Information Act request for United States Secret Service records of visits Clinton may have made to Little St. James produced no such evidence. According to Epstein's flight logs, Clinton never flew near the U.S. Virgin Islands. In July 2019, a Clinton spokesperson issued a statement saying Clinton never visited the island.

David Copperfield proposed to Claudia Schiffer on Little St. James, three months after meeting her in 1993.

Jes Staley, the former head of Barclays, visited the island in 2015.

Reputation under Epstein's ownership

According to The Independent, "Epstein's island developed a reputation for depravity, and it is alleged that underage girls were gang raped on Little St. James." It has acquired such nicknames as "Island of Sin", "Pedophile Island", and "Orgy Island".

According to attorneys for Epstein's alleged victims, Little St. James is where many of the crimes against minors were committed by Epstein and friends who traveled there with him. Court documents allege that then 17-year-old Virginia Roberts was forced by Epstein to have sex with Prince Andrew on several occasions, including as part of an orgy on Little St. James. Buckingham Palace has denied this allegation. A lawyer for Epstein has described the allegations of orgies by Roberts as "old and discredited".

According to locals, Epstein continued to bring underage girls to the island in 2019, after he was registered as a sex offender. In August 2019, following Epstein's death, FBI agents searched his residence on Little St. James.

See also
Great Saint James, U.S. Virgin Islands
Age of Consent in the US Virgin Islands

References

East End, Saint Thomas, U.S. Virgin Islands
Islands of the United States Virgin Islands
Private islands of the United States Virgin Islands
Jeffrey Epstein